Sreya Jayadeep (born 5 November 2005) is an Indian singer. She has sung on music albums and films in South Indian languages. She has appeared on reality shows.

By age fourteen, she had recorded more than 60+ films, along with 200 devotional and 70 general albums. Her first commercial song was the Christian devotional album Hitham; she later released Sreyam. Sreya began music lessons at age three. Her teacher in classical music was Thamarakkad Krishnan Namboodiri, and playback singer Sathish Babu trained her in different genres of music. She attended Silver Hills Higher Secondary School. As of 2020 she was in tenth grade at Devagiri CMI Public School.  Sreya has been touring around the world to Europe, including Britain, and been to USA, UAE, Qatar, Saudi Arabia and Australia.

Career 

Sreya was crowned the Surya TV ‘Surya Singer – 2013’ (Malayalam) title at age 8 followed by Sun TV ‘Sun Singer – 2014 (Tamil)’. Her debut as a playback singer was in the Malayalam film Weeping Boy in 2013 with two songs, "Chema Chema Chemanoru" and "Thaaraattupaattum". Her song "Mele Manathe Eashoye" from the Christian devotional album ‘God’ under the direction of music stalwart Composer Sri. M. Jayachandran was viewed more than 11 million times.  This song made her popular. Subsequently she received a lot of film offers and worked in Malayalam films. Her song "Enno Njan Ente" from the film Amar Akbar Anthony (2015) was well received.

In 2016, she sang "Minungum Minnaminuge" in Oppam  which earned more than 70 million views in YouTube. She worked with almost all the leading music directors and has worked in Tamil, Telugu, and Kannada films. Sreya's Tamil song based on the biography Wings of Dreams depicted the life of Dr. A. P. J. Abdul Kalam. She is part of Kerala Government's ‘Harithasree Project’ an environmental action initiative, Water Conservation Project by Mathrubhumi and Rubella Vaccine campaign by National Health Mission. In 2022, she replaced Baby Meenakshi as the lead Host of popular reality show Flowers Top singer season 3.

Sreya Jayadeep has an alto-soprano vocal range and can sing at a speed of 600+ beats per minute, according to her live performance on YouTube in Flower's Top Singer. She sang a K. S. Chithra song, which plead the audio with applause. She can play a little bit of keyboard and guitar.

Awards

Discography

References

External links 
 

2005 births
Living people
Indian women playback singers
Singers from Kerala
Malayalam playback singers
Musicians from Kozhikode
Film musicians from Kerala
21st-century Indian women singers
21st-century Indian singers